The Postman's White Nights (Belye nochi pochtalona Alekseya Tryapitsyna) is a 2014 Russian drama film directed by Andrei Konchalovsky. It tells the story of the people of a remote Russian village, whose main contact with the outside world is a postman. All actors in the film are non-professionals, with casting taking place over a year.

It was selected for the In Competition section at the 71st Venice International Film Festival and won the Silver Lion. It received generally positive reviews from critics. In September 2014, director Konchalovsky withdrew the film from the list of films being considered for the Russian entry for the Academy Award for Best Foreign Language Film. It was filmed at the Kenozersky National Park, Arkhangelsk Oblast, Russia.

Cast
 Aleksey Tryapitsyn as Postman
 Timur Bondarenko as Timur, Irina's son
 Irina Ermolova as Irina

Reception 
As of 20 September 2020, The Postman's White Nights has an approval rating of 89% on review aggregator website Rotten Tomatoes, based on 9 reviews, and an average rating of 8.0/10. The film was reviewed by Variety magazine, which said that likable protagonists and some stunning shots do not cover its weak spots. The film also got 83% on Metacritic, based on 4 reviews and on Cine Vue who gave him four stars.
 The Hollywood Reporter:
"The setting itself is gorgeous, with its boxy cottages fringed by grassy clearings and woodlands, and the placid surface of the water stretching on for miles. It's a rare pleasure to see a film made with such an elegant compositional eye […] Deep-focus shots of Lyokha at his most pensive, standing on the shores of the lake, are loaded with a sense of place, and of belonging. The same goes for the hypnotic Steadycam sequences of him zooming along in his boat, the sound of the motor quietly giving way to a slow build of electronica composer Eduard Artemyev's stirring ambient score with choral elements."
 Indiewire.com: 
"'The Postman's White Nights' is being widely celebrated as a quasi-documentary, marked by a droll sense of humor that illuminates life in a forgotten corner of the world. And it is that, no doubt, but for us it went much further than mere anthropological interest. If it presents an accurate picture of this reality, then it feels like it's a reality that is unstable, so far cut off from the mainstream of life that it has begun to fray into the surreal and the magic at the edges."

References

External links
 
 

2014 films
2014 drama films
Russian drama films
2010s Russian-language films
Films directed by Andrei Konchalovsky
Films scored by Eduard Artemyev